The Döbbelinsches Theater or Döbbelin Theater, was a theater in Berlin, active between 1764 and 1799. It was the first permanent German language theater in Berlin.  It was founded by Karl Schuch and named after its director, Karl Theophil Döbbelin.  Prior to its foundation, Berlin had an opera house (founded in 1742) which only employed Italian artists, and travelling theater troupes often visited the city, but the Döbbeling theater was the first permanent theater for a permanent German language stage company.

References

 Dagmar Claus: Einer, der den Hanswurst vertrieb. Carl Theophil Doebbelin (1727–1793). In: Berlinische Monatsschrift 2/1997 beim Luisenstädtischen Bildungsverein, S. 68ff

18th-century establishments in Prussia
Theatres completed in 1764
18th century in Berlin
History of Berlin